Colin Christopher Brown (born August 29, 1985) is a former American football offensive tackle. He played college football for the Missouri Tigers and was drafted in the fifth round by the Kansas City Chiefs in the 2009 NFL Draft.

The Buffalo Bills released Colin Brown on October 15, 2013.

References

External links 
Missouri Tigers bio
United Football League bio

1985 births
Living people
People from Chillicothe, Missouri
Players of American football from Missouri
American football offensive tackles
Missouri Tigers football players
Kansas City Chiefs players
Hartford Colonials players
Baltimore Ravens players
Buffalo Bills players